Mark Stephenson (born 29 September 1976 from Yarm) is a former English professional darts player who has played in the Professional Darts Corporation (PDC) events. He was formerly an official, working as a marker.

Career

Stephenson fell one game short of qualifying for the 2007 PDC World Darts Championship, losing to Alan Tabern. He then fell two rounds short in qualifying for the 2008 PDC World Darts Championship, losing to Kirk Shepherd who eventually qualified and went on to reach the final. Stephenson finally qualified for the World Championship at the third time of asking, beating Jason Clark, Gary Welding and then Ray Farrell to earn one of the eight qualifying spots. He faced five-time world champion and the Number 2 seed Raymond van Barneveld in the first round, losing 3 sets to nil. Stephenson left the PDC in January 2020.

Mark currently works for Datadart.

World Championship results

PDC

 2009: 1st Round (lost to Raymond van Barneveld 0–3) (sets)

External links
Profile and stats on Darts Database

English darts players
1976 births
Living people
Professional Darts Corporation former tour card holders